Rotting Christ is a Greek black metal band formed in 1987. They are noted for being one of the first black metal bands within this region, as well as a premier act within the European underground metal scene. They are also responsible for creating the signature Greek black metal sound prevalent in the early 1990s.

History 
Rotting Christ was founded in 1987 as a grindcore act. They released a series of demos and splits with local bands during their rehearsal era. During this period, the group gradually altered their sound with influence from proto-black metal bands like Celtic Frost and Venom, and in the process became one of the inaugurators of black metal. Their 1989 demo, Satanas Tedeum, presented a crossover between black metal and grindcore. In 1991, the band released Passage to Arcturo, their career-breaking EP.

One of band's major debuts was on the 1993 "Fuck Christ Tour", which also featured Immortal and Blasphemy. During this concert, some audience members had engaged in cutting and self-mutilation that resulted in hospitalization. Before signing to Unisound Records (a now-defunct Athens-based independent record label founded in 1992), Mayhem's Øystein Aarseth had expressed interest in distributing the band through his Deathlike Silence Productions label, but due to Aarseth's murder the same year, nothing materialized. The band signed to Century Media in 1996 and remained on their roster for 10 years before joining Season of Mist.

Rotting Christ has played in many regions outside their native Greece, including the Americas, Greater Europe, Russia, the United Kingdom, Malta and the Middle East. Several heavy metal festivals around the world have hosted the band, including the 2003 Wacken Open Air in Schleswig-Holstein, Germany. Past tour mates include My Dying Bride, Tristania, Tiamat, Vintersorg, Finntroll, Agathodaimon, Old Man's Child, Malevolent Creation, Anorexia Nervosa, Vader, Krisiun, Deicide, Behemoth, Melechesh and Nile, among many others.

Rotting Christ was one of the first bands announced to perform the Barge to Hell festival, which is a metal-themed cruise organized by Ultimate Metal Cruises and took place aboard Royal Caribbean's Majesty of the Seas. Barge to Hell set sail from Port of Miami on December 3, 2012.

, Rotting Christ has been around for 25 years and is one of the longest running bands within the black metal genre. In celebration of the band's longevity, the 2-DVD + 2-CD compilation Non Serviam: A 20 Year Apocryphal Story, shot in Athens on December 8, 2007, was released worldwide February 23, 2009.

Aealo, the band's tenth studio album, was released on February 15, 2010, in Europe and February 23, 2010, in the United States.

Their eleventh album, Katá ton Daímona Eautoú, was released in March 2013.

They made their first appearance in South Asia on September 13, 2014, in India (Bangalore Open Air 2014 Edition) and September 14, 2014, in Sri Lanka.

Their twelfth studio album, Rituals, was released on February 12, 2016.

To coincide with their 30th anniversary, the band released a new 7-inch single "The Call" on February 9, 2018; the single's b-side is a live version of "The Sign of Evil Existence", which includes guest vocals by Behemoth's Nergal and Varathron's Stefan Necroabyssious. The band also released an official biography entitled "Non Serviam: The Official Story Of Rotting Christ" in late November 2018, written by Sakis Tolis and British author Dayal Patterson (author of 'Black Metal: Evolution Of The Cult', 'The Cult Never Dies Vol. One' and 'Into The Abyss') and published by British publishing house Cult Never Dies. The book features extensive interviews with Sakis Tolis, Themis Tolis, Jim Mutilator, Morbid, George Emmanuel and members of the bands Watain, Mayhem, Enslaved, Moonspell, Blasphemy, Mystifier, Septicflesh, Behemoth, Macabre Omen, Cradle Of Filth and Immolation  The book has since been released in Greek, Russian and Czech languages.

Rotting Christ's thirteenth studio album, The Heretics, was released on February 15, 2019.

In 2020, Rotting Christ announced a collaboration with the video game developer Cold Symmetry on their action role-playing video game, Mortal Shell.  The game's launch trailer, released in August 2020, featured the song "χξς (666)" as its soundtrack. In addition, a downloadable content pack, titled "Rotten Autumn", was released for the game in October 2020 and includes, among other content, an alternative soundtrack composed by Rotting Christ.

Line-up 
The permanent line-up consists of brothers Sakis Tolis (vocals and guitar) and Themis Tolis (drums). Third founding member Jim Patsouris played bass until 1996. Andreas Lagios was the bassist since 1997, taking the stead of Patsouris until the end of 2011. Nightfall's Giorgos Bokos joined as a guitarist in 2005, replacing Costas Vasilakopoulos. In February 2012, Bokos announced his departure from the band for personal reasons. In December 2012, the new members of the band were announced: guitarist George Emmanuel and bassist Vagelis Karzis. George Emmanuel and Vagelis Karzis amicably left the band in February and May 2019 respectively to pursue other projects.

Three keyboardists had previously been a part of the band; George Tolias, George Zaharopoulos (Magus Wampyr Daoloth of Necromantia) and a session musician known only as Panayiotis (on A Dead Poem).

The band members from the beginning, up to Triarchy of the Lost Lovers album, were using the pseudonyms Necromayhem for Sakis, Necrosauron for Themis and Mutilator for Jim (Dimitris). George Zaharopoulos used the pseudonym Morbid for early EP and split-LP releases up to Passage to Arcturo, and the pseudonym Magus Wampyr Daoloth for Thy Mighty Contract and Non Serviam.

Publicity 
Over the years, the group has faced controversy due to their name and gained international media attention in November 1999 during the 2000 United States Presidential Primaries for Republican Nomination, when candidate/Christian conservative Gary Bauer accused the band of being "anti-Catholic", among other things. In response to Bauer's criticism, Sakis Tolis wrote:

They also have had to cancel some shows, most recently in May 2005, when Megadeth frontman Dave Mustaine threatened to refuse to play at a Greek concert if Rotting Christ were on the bill.

In response to their forced cancellation, Tolis noted:

Nuclear Assault and former Anthrax bassist Dan Lilker defended Rotting Christ and criticized Dave Mustaine's actions, as did Nevermore's Warrel Dane, whose bands appeared on Mustaine's Gigantour in 2005. Dane added:

When playing in Malta, a country which in its constitution declares itself as Roman Catholic, trouble from the Church and other Catholic groups ensued when an unknown person stuck a Rotting Christ flyer to a church door. The band was allowed to play eventually even though they had to change venue.

In April 2018, Rotting Christ were scheduled to play in Georgia. Upon arriving in Tbilisi, founding members Sakis and Themis Tolis  were arrested by Georgian authorities under suspicion of terrorism due to their band name, as reported by an announcement from the band's label, Season of Mist.  They had their passports and cell phones confiscated and were detained in prison, without being permitted legal representation or contact with the Greek Embassy for 12 hours.  Afterwards, they were informed by their lawyers that the two were included in a "list of unwanted people for reasons of national security" that labeled them as "Satanists" and "suspects of terrorism".  The two were eventually released, after arrangements made by the band's other members in collaboration with the local promoter, "who involved legal experts, journalists and activists in Georgia".  The band was allowed to perform their scheduled concert and left for their next destination, Armenia, without hassle.

A species of prehistoric brittle star, Brezinacantha tolis, was named after band members Sakis and Themis Tolis.

Musical style 
Early in their career, they were responsible for creating what is known as the "classic" Greek black metal sound which can be heard in other bands such as Varathron and Thou Art Lord. Despite the name, the band's traditional lyrical themes involving evil and occultism has evolved into a more "mystic" path, and they have modified their musical direction on each album, utilizing elements such as clean melodic baritone vocals, doom, gothic metal and industrial music traits, and male/female Benedictine chants. Recent albums, beginning with Khronos, have shown the band taking a more modern, faster and more aggressive approach to their blackened-gothic style. Their 2007 album, Theogonia, especially, has been described as more "atmospheric" and "epic" by their label.

The group's choice of producers, engineers and mixers has also been varied; Swedish extreme metal figures Dan Swanö (Unisound), Peter Tägtgren (Abyss Studios) and Fredrik Nordström (Studio Fredman), German producers Andy Classen (Asphyx, Belphegor), Siggi Bemm (Therion, Theatre of Tragedy) and Waldemar Sorychta (Lacuna Coil, The Gathering) as well as Xy (Samael percussionist/keyboardist) have all contributed to production on the band's albums.

Band members 

Current members
 Sakis Tolis − lead vocals, rhythm guitar, keyboards, bass (studio only) (1987–present)
 Themis Tolis − drums (1987–present)
 Kostas "Spades" Heliotis − bass, backing vocals (2019–present)
 Kostis Foukarakis − lead guitar, backing vocals (2019–present)

Session musicians
 Markus "Makka" Freiwald − drums (1996)
 Panayiotis − keyboards (1997)

Former members
 Jim "Mutilator" Patsouris − bass, backing vocals (1987–1996)
 George "Magus Wampyr Daoloth" Zaharopoulos − keyboards, backing vocals (1991–1995)
 Costas Vasilakopoulos − lead guitar, backing vocals (1996–2004)
 Andreas Lagios − bass, backing vocals (1997–2011)
 Georgios Tolias − keyboards, backing vocals (1997–2003)
 Giorgos Bokos − lead guitar, backing vocals (2005–2012)
 George Emmanuel − lead guitar, backing vocals (2012–2019)
 Vagelis "Van Ace" Karzis − bass, backing vocals (2012–2019)
 Stamatis "Melanaegis" Petrakos − bass, backing vocals (2019)
 Giannis Kalamatas − lead guitar, backing vocals (2019)

Timeline

Discography

Full-lengths 
Thy Mighty Contract (1993)
Non Serviam (1994)
Triarchy of the Lost Lovers (1996)
A Dead Poem (1997)
Sleep of the Angels (1999)
Khronos (2000)
Genesis (2002)
Sanctus Diavolos (2004)
Theogonia (2007)
Aealo (2010)
Κατά τον δαίμονα εαυτού (2013)
Rituals (2016)
The Heretics (2019)

EPs 
 Passage to Arcturo (1991, Decapitated Records)

Demos, singles, and DVDs 
 Leprosy of Death (1988, unofficial demo)
 Decline's Return (1989, demo)
 The Other Side of Life (1989, split EP with Sound Pollution)
 Satanas Tedeum (1989, demo)
 Rotting Christ / Monumentum (1991, split with Monumentum)
 Dawn of the Iconoclast (1991, EP)
 Ade's Winds (1992, demo)
 Apokathelosis (1993, EP)
 The Mystical Meeting (1997, single/live/cover compilation)
 Der Perfekte Traum (1999, single/live)
 In Domine Sathana (2003, live DVD)
 Non Serviam: A 20 Year Apocryphal Story (2009, live DVD/CD)
 A Soundtrack to Mikael Häll's Doctoral Dissertation (2012, Malört förlag, split 7-inch single with Negative Plane)
 Promo 1995 (2013, EP)
 Lucifer over Athens (2015, live album)
 The Call (2017, b side the sign of evil existence live, special edition 45rpm EP)

Compilations 
 The Mystical Meeting (1995)
 Thanatiphoro Anthologio (2007, best-of compilation)
 Semigods of the Serpent Cult (2009)
 25 Years: The Path of Evil Existence (2014)
 Their Greatest Spells (2018)

Books 
 Non Serviam: The Official Story Of Rotting Christ (2018)

Music videos

Notes

References

External links 

 
 
 

Grindcore musical groups
Greek black metal musical groups
Greek gothic metal musical groups
Greek heavy metal musical groups
Musical groups established in 1987
Musical quartets
Musical groups from Athens
Metal Mind Productions artists
Century Media Records artists
Season of Mist artists
1987 establishments in Greece
Sibling musical groups